Viente Reales is one of the constituent barangays in the city of Valenzuela, Metro Manila in the  Philippines. The barangay is home to industrial factories of wire, fishball, packaging and rubber products.

Etymology
The origin of the name Viente Reales came from a legend that their ancestors paid "veinte reales" or twenty reales (2.50 pesos) for the land to the Spaniards during the Spanish occupation of the Philippines.  Another legend was that there was a magic well that contains delicious water that can quickly heal any sickness. But in order for you to drink it, you must pay Veinte Reales (20 reales).

Education
The barangay has one public educational facility for elementary (Paltok Elementary School) and one facility for high school (Veinte Reales National High School).

Economy
The barangay is home to industrial factories of home furnitures, steel, plastics, wire, fish balls, packaging and rubber products. Flexo Manufacturing Corporation, Meralco and Innovative are among the companies that are located in this barangay

Landmarks
Famous landmarks in Veinte Reales include the Parish of the Risen Lord Church, Valenzuela Memorial Park, Lena Basketball Court and Bernabe Basketball Court.

References

External links

Valenzuela, Philippines official site

Barangays of Metro Manila
Valenzuela, Metro Manila